Simon Krekula (born February 5, 1998) is a Swedish professional ice hockey player. He is currently playing with HC Vita Hästen of the HockeyAllsvenskan (Allsv).

Playing career
Krekula's career began with Skellefteå AIK where he played on the U16, U18 and U20 junior teams. In 2012–13, he debuted at the under-16 level, playing six games in the J16 SM. The following season he dressed for 19 U18 games, recording six goals and twelve assists. He also competed with a regional all-star team from Västerbotten in the annual TV-pucken, an under-15 national tournament, and notched two goals and five assists over eight games. In 2014–15, Krekula moved on to the J20 SuperElit scene.

After two impressive seasons in J20, appearing in 80 games, and recording 63 points, Krekula logged his first minutes in Sweden's top-flight SHL.

Having left Skellefteå AIK at the conclusion of his contract on 25 June 2018, Krekula agreed to an initial one-year contract with Allsvenskan club, HC Vita Hästen.

Career statistics

Regular season and playoffs

International

References

External links

1998 births
Living people
Piteå HC players
Skellefteå AIK players
Swedish ice hockey forwards
Ice hockey people from Stockholm
HC Vita Hästen players